Pee-wee's Playhouse is an American comedy television series starring Paul Reubens as the childlike Pee-wee Herman that ran from 1986 to 1990 on Saturday mornings on CBS, and airing in reruns until July 1991. The show was developed from Reubens's popular stage show and the TV special The Pee-wee Herman Show, produced for HBO, which was similar in style but featured much more adult humor.

In 2004 and 2007, Pee-wee's Playhouse was ranked No. 10 and No. 12 on TV Guides Top Cult Shows Ever, respectively.

Development
The Pee-wee Herman character was developed by Reubens into a live stage show titled The Pee-wee Herman Show in 1980. It features many characters that would go on to appear in Playhouse, including Captain Carl, Jambi the Genie, Miss Yvonne, Pterri the Pterodactyl, and Clocky. While enjoying continuous popularity with the show, Reubens teamed with young director Tim Burton in 1985 to make the comedy film Pee-wee's Big Adventure. It became one of the year's surprise hits, costing a relatively modest $6 million to make but taking in $45 million at the box office.

After seeing the success of Pee-wee's Big Adventure, the CBS network approached Reubens with an ill-received cartoon series proposal.

Reubens assembled a supporting troupe that included ex-Groundlings and cast members from The Pee-wee Herman Show, including Phil Hartman, John Paragon, Lynne Marie Stewart, Laurence Fishburne, and S. Epatha Merkerson. Production began in New York City in the summer of 1986 in a converted loft on Broadway, which one of the show's writers, George McGrath, described as a "sweatshop". Reubens moved the production to Los Angeles for season two in 1987, resulting in a new set and a more relaxed work atmosphere.

The creative design of the show was concocted by a troupe of artists including Wayne White, Gary Panter, Craig Bartlett, Nick Park, Richard Goleszowski, Gregory Harrison, Ric Heitzman, and Phil Trumbo. The first day of production, right as Panter began reading the scripts to find out where everything would be situated, set workers hurriedly asked him, "Where's the plans? All the carpenters are standing here ready to build everything." Panter responded, "You just have to give us 15 minutes to design this thing!" When asked about the styles that went into the set design, Panter said, "This was like the hippie dream ... It was a show made by artists ... We put art history all over the show. It's really like ... I think Mike Kelley said, and it's right, that it's kind of like the Googie style – it's like those LA types of coffee shops and stuff but kind of psychedelic, over-the-top." Several artistic filmmaking techniques are featured on the program including chroma key, stop-motion animation, and clay animation.

Pee-Wee's Playhouse was designed as an educational yet entertaining and artistic show for children. Its conception was greatly influenced by 1950s shows Reubens had watched as a child, like The Rocky and Bullwinkle Show, The Mickey Mouse Club, Captain Kangaroo, and Howdy Doody. The show quickly acquired a dual audience of kids and adults. Reubens, always trying to make Pee-wee a positive role model, sought to make a significantly moral show that would teach children the ethics of reciprocity. Reubens believed that children liked the Playhouse because it was fast-paced, colorful, and "never talked down to them", while parents liked the Playhouse because it reminded them of the past.

Production
At the start of season two, the show moved from its New York City warehouse studio to facilities at the Hollywood Center Studios, creating changes in personnel and a change to the set that allowed the show to take advantage of the additional space. The show changed production facilities again in 1989 during its fourth season, this time at the Culver Studios, also in Los Angeles.

Format 
The premise of the show is that host Pee-wee Herman plays in the fantastic Playhouse in Puppetland. The house is filled with toys, gadgets, talking furniture and appliances (such as Magic Screen and Chairry), puppet characters (such as Conky the Robot, Pterri the baby Pteranodon), and Jambi (John Paragon), a disembodied genie's head who lives in a jeweled box. The Playhouse is visited by a regular cast of human characters, including Miss Yvonne (Lynne Marie Stewart), Reba The Mail Lady (S. Epatha Merkerson), Captain Carl (Phil Hartman), Cowboy Curtis (Laurence Fishburne), and a small group of children, The Playhouse Gang.

Although primarily a live-action comedy, each episode includes segments featuring puppetry, video animation, and prepared sequences using Chroma-key and stock footage (for example when Pee-wee jumps into the Magic Screen), as well as inserted clay animation sequences (some made by Aardman Animations, who would later make Wallace & Gromit) and excerpts from cartoons from the Golden Age of American animation and in the public domain, usually presented by the character "The King of Cartoons". Each episode features specially written soundtrack music by rock and pop musicians such as Mark Mothersbaugh (Devo), Todd Rundgren, Mitchell Froom, and The Residents. The show's theme song performance is credited to "Ellen Shaw", though in her autobiography, Cyndi Lauper admits to being the actual singer.

The show has many recurring gags, themes, and devices. Each episode usually contained a running gag particular to that episode, or a specific event or dilemma that sends Pee-wee into an emotional frenzy. At the beginning of each episode, viewers are told the day's "secret word" (often issued by Conky the Robot) and are instructed to "scream real loud" every time a character says the word.

CBS and Reubens mutually agreed to end the show at the end of the 1990–91 season after 5 seasons and 45 episodes. The last original episode aired on November 17, 1990. In July 1991, Reubens was arrested for exposing himself in a Sarasota, Florida, adult movie theater, prompting CBS to immediately stop airing its Playhouse re-runs, which were originally intended to air until late 1991. The show was replaced by reruns of The Adventures of Raggedy Ann and Andy.

Soundtracks
The music for the show was provided by a diverse set of musicians, including Mark Mothersbaugh, The Residents, Todd Rundgren, Danny Elfman (who provided the score for both of the Pee-wee movies), Mitchell Froom, Van Dyke Parks, George S. Clinton, and Dweezil Zappa with Scott Thunes (spelled 'Tunis' in the credits).

Mothersbaugh, who later went on to become a fixture in composing music for children's shows like Rugrats, joined the show on hiatus from recording with Devo.

The opening prelude theme is an interpretation of Les Baxter's "Quiet Village". The theme song, which originally followed the prelude, was performed by Cyndi Lauper (credited as "Ellen Shaw"), imitating Betty Boop. For the final season in 1990, a new version of the prelude theme was recorded, and the opening theme was slightly edited.

Cast and crew
Many now-well-known TV and film actors appeared on the show, including Sandra Bernhard, Laurence Fishburne, Phil Hartman, Natasha Lyonne, S. Epatha Merkerson, Jimmy Smits, and Lynne Stewart. Future heavy metal musician and filmmaker Rob Zombie was a production assistant, and future filmmaker John Singleton was a security guard.

Season 3 (which consisted of only three episodes) included an all-star Christmas special featuring the regular cast, with appearances by Annette Funicello, Frankie Avalon, Magic Johnson, Dinah Shore, Joan Rivers, Zsa Zsa Gabor, Oprah Winfrey, Whoopi Goldberg, Little Richard, Cher, Charo, k.d. lang, the Del Rubio triplets, and Grace Jones.

Humans

Puppet and object characters

Reception

Critical reception 
As soon as it first aired, Pee-wee's Playhouse fascinated media theorists and commentators, many of whom championed the show as a postmodernist hodgepodge of characters and situations that appeared to thumb its nose at the racist and sexist presumptions of dominant culture. For example, Pee-wee's friends, both human and not, were of diverse cultural and racial origins. In its entire run, Pee-wee's Playhouse won 15 Emmys, as well as other awards. Captain Kangaroo'''s Bob Keeshan hailed the show's "awesome production values," adding, "with the possible exception of the Muppets, you can't find such creativity anywhere on TV."

"I'm just trying to illustrate that it's okay to be different — not that it's good, not that it's bad, but that it's all right. I'm trying to tell kids to have a good time and to encourage them to be creative and to question things," Reubens told an interviewer in Rolling Stone.

On November 1, 2011, in commemoration of the 25th anniversary of the show, a book by Caseen Gaines called Inside Pee-wee's Playhouse: The Untold, Unauthorized, and Unpredictable Story of a Pop Phenomenon, was released by ECW Press.Inside Pee-wee's Playhouse – Book Website Retrieved July 29, 2011

 Awards and nominations 
 14th Daytime Emmy Awards – 1987
 Outstanding Makeup – Sharon Ilson (won)
 Outstanding Hairstyling – Sally Hershberger and Eric Gregg (won)
 Outstanding Art Direction/Set Decoration/Scenic Design – Gary Panter, Sydney J. Bartholomew Jr., Nancy Deren, Wayne White, and Ric Heitzman (won)
 Outstanding Film Sound Mixing – Rolf Pardula and Ken Hahn
 Outstanding Videotape Editing – Paul Dougherty, Doug Jines, Joe Castellano, Les Kaye, and Howard Silver
 Outstanding Graphics and Title Design – Prudence Fenton and Phil Trumbo (won)
 15th Daytime Emmy Awards – 1988
 Outstanding Art Direction/Set Decoration/Scenic Design – Gary Panter, Wayne White, Ric Heitzman, Jeremy Railton, James Higginson, and Paul Reubens (won)
 Outstanding Makeup – Ve Neill (won)
 Outstanding Videotape Editing – John Ward Nielson for "Playhouse in Outer Space"
 16th Daytime Emmy Awards – 1989
 Outstanding Hairstyling – Yolanda Toussieng Jerry Masone for "To Tell The Tooth" (won, tied with The Oprah Winfrey Show)
 Outstanding Videotape Editing – Charles Randazzo, Peter W. Moyer, David Pincus, and Steve Purcell for "To Tell The Tooth" (won)
 Outstanding Film Sound Editing – Steve Kirklys, Steve Michael, Peter Cole, Ken Dahlinger, Greg Teall, and John Walker for "To Tell The Tooth" (won, tied with Muppet Babies)
 18th Daytime Emmy Awards – 1991
 Outstanding Graphics and Title Design – Paul Reubens, Prudence Fenton, and Dorne Huebler (won)
 Outstanding Film Sound Editing – Peter Cole, Chris Trent, Glenn A. Jordan, Steve Kirklys, Ken Dahlinger, and John Walker (won)
 Outstanding Film Sound Mixing – Bo Harwood, Peter Cole, Chris Trent, and Troy Smith (won)

Episodes

 Home media 
 Hi-Tops Video releases 
 Vol. 1: "Ice Cream Soup"
 Vol. 2: "Luau for Two"
 Vol. 3: "Rainy Day" / "Now You See Me, Now You Don't" / "Cowboy Fun (Just Another Day)"
 Vol. 4: "Beauty Makeover"
 Vol. 5: "Restaurant"
 Vol. 6: "Ants in Your Pants"
 Vol. 7: "Monster in the Playhouse"
 Festival of Fun: "The Gang's All Here" / "Stolen Apples" / "Party" / "The Cowboy and the Cowntess" / "Monster in the Playhouse"
 Vol. 8: "Open House"
 Vol. 9: "Puppy in the Playhouse"
 Vol. 10: "Pajama Party"
 Vol. 11: "Pee-wee's Store"
 Vol. 12: "Pee-wee Catches a Cold"
 Vol. 13: "Tons of Fun"
 "Pee-wee's Playhouse Christmas Special"
 Vol. 14: "School"
 Vol. 15: "Why Wasn't I Invited?"

 Hi-Tops Video LaserDisc releases 
 Fun-o-Rama: "Ice Cream Soup" / "Luau for Two" / "Rainy Day" / "Now You See Me, Now You Don't"
 Potpourri: "Just Another Day" / "Beauty Makeover" / "The Restaurant" / "Ants in Your Pants"
 "Pee-wee's Playhouse Christmas Special" (also released by MGM/UA Home Video in 1996)

 MGM/UA Home Video releases 
 Vol. 1: "Open House" / "Pee-wee Catches a Cold"
 Vol. 2: "I Remember Curtis" / "Conky's Breakdown"
 Vol. 3: "Store" / "Playhouse in Outer Space"
 Vol. 4: "Pajama Party" / "To Tell the Tooth"
 Vol. 5: "The Gang's All Here" / "Party"
 Vol. 6: "Luau for Two" / "Now You See Me, Now You Don't"
 Vol. 7: "Fire in the Playhouse" / "Love That Story"
 Vol. 8: "Sick? Did Somebody Say Sick?" / "Miss Yvonne's Visit"
 "Pee-wee's Playhouse Christmas Special"
 Vol. 9: "Dr. Pee-wee and the Del Rubios" / "Rebarella"
 Vol. 10: "Let's Play Office" / "Mystery"
 Vol. 11: "Front Page Pee-wee" / "Tango Time"
 Vol. 12: "Playhouse Day" / "Accidental Playhouse"
 Vol. 13: "Ice Cream Soup" / "Puppy in the Playhouse"
 Vol. 14: "The Cowboy and the Cowntess" / "Reba Eats and Pterri Runs"
 Vol. 15: "Tons of Fun" / "School"
 Vol. 16: "Why Wasn't I Invited?" / "Ants in Your Pants"

DVD releases
Image Entertainment has released all 45 episodes of Pee-wee's Playhouse'' on DVD as NTSC Region 0 discs.

Blu-ray releases 
On July 3, 2013, Shout! Factory announced that they had acquired the rights to the entire series from Paul Reubens, which was released on Blu-ray on October 21, 2014. In addition, the entire series was digitally remastered from the original 16 mm film elements and original audio tracks. As of March 24, 2022, this title is out-of-print.

References

External links
Official site for Pee-wee's Playhouse

Inside Pee-wee's Playhouse – Book Website
ProgressiveBoink.com: "The 25 Best Pee-wee's Playhouse Moments"
The Pee-wee Herman Show on Broadway

1986 American television series debuts
1990 American television series endings
1980s American children's comedy television series
1990s American children's comedy television series
American children's education television series
American television series with live action and animation
American television shows featuring puppetry
CBS original programming
English-language television shows
Genies in television
Pee-wee Herman